Propicillin is a penicillin. Properties are similar to benzylpenicillin particularly used in streptococcal infections, not resistant to penicillinase. It is acid resistant and can be used orally as the potassium salt.

References 

Penicillins